Guderian is a 1987 video game published by The Avalon Hill Game Company.

Gameplay
Guderian is a game in which the German drive on Smolensk during 1941 is simulated.

Reception
William H. Harrington reviewed the game for Computer Gaming World, and stated that "Guderian is a very playable game with options that help gamers avoid some of the complexity and lugubrious pace of other products."

Reviews
Computer Gaming World - Nov, 1991
 Casus Belli #46 (Aug 1988)

References

External links
Review in Antic

1987 video games
Apple II games
Atari 8-bit family games
Avalon Hill video games
Commodore 64 games
Computer wargames
Video games about Nazi Germany
Video games developed in the United States
Video games set in the Soviet Union
World War II video games